David John Bryant (born 29 October 1950) is an English former first-class cricketer.

Bryant was born at Wandsworth in October 1950 and later studied at Pembroke College, Oxford. While studying at Oxford, he played first-class cricket for Oxford University on six occasions in 1970 and 1971. A right-arm fast-medium bowler, he took 8 wickets at an average of 52.87, with best figures of 3 for 40. Batting, he scored 19 runs with a high score of 6 not out.

References

External links

1950 births
Living people
People from Wandsworth
Alumni of Pembroke College, Oxford
English cricketers
Oxford University cricketers